Katharine Schlesinger (born 29 April 1963) is a British actress, the niece of the film director John Schlesinger and great-niece of Dame Peggy Ashcroft. She starred as Catherine in the 1987 film adaptation of Jane Austen's Northanger Abbey.

Theatre
In 1990, she listed her earlier provincial stage work as:
 Romeo and Juliet at the Sheffield Crucible;
 Agnes of God, Stags and Hens, Martin Chuzzlewit and Fair Stood the Wind for France, at the Theatre Royal Northampton;
 The Marvellous Land of Oz at the Leeds Playhouse;
 Nell Dunn's The Little Heroine at the Nuffield, Southampton.

Listed London work included:
 A Midsummer Night's Dream, The Merry Wives of Windsor and Bashville, at the Open Air Theatre, Regent's Park (1984);
 The Secret Diary of Adrian Mole at the Wyndham's Theatre (December 1984);
 Three Sisters at the Greenwich Theatre (March 1987) and the Albery Theatre (June 1987);
 The Living Room at the Royalty Theatre (October 1987).

She made her National Theatre debut in 1988 as Grace Wellborn in Ben Jonson's Bartholomew Fair staged in the Olivier Theatre, followed in 1989 by her role as Jacinta in the Cottesloe revival of Lope de Vega's Fuenteovejuna. In November 1989, again at the National, she played the title role in Steven Berkoff's symbolist stage adaptation of Oscar Wilde's Salome, a production which transferred to the Phoenix Theatre in January 1990. "Katharine Schlesinger mimed the dance of the seven veils and, without having taken anything off, persuaded a hushed audience that she was standing there totally naked.": critic Robert Tanitch.

In February 1991 at the Royal Court's Theatre Upstairs, she took part in performances of selected plays in the Young Writers' Festival. Since then no further London stage credits for Katharine Schlesinger have been listed in the Theatre Record annual Indexes.

Audio work
Schlesinger's audio work includes William Shakespeare's Love's Labour's Lost and Henry VIII.

She also sang the period song That's the Way to the Zoo in her appearance in the Doctor Who serial Ghost Light (1989).

Select filmography
 In the Beginning .... Miriam (TVM 2000)
 Simon Magus .... Askha (1999)
 The Tale of Sweeney Todd .... Lucy (TVM 1998)
 The Bill - Puzzled .... Nicky (TV series)
 Silent Witness - An Academic Exercise .... Dr Annabelle Evans (TV series)
 Rides .... Sue-Lyn (TV series, 1992–93)
 Young Catherine .... Elizabeth Vorontsova (TV mini-series, 1991)
 Doctor Who - Ghost Light .... Gwendoline (October 1989)
 Madame Sousatzka .... Piano Student (film, director John Schlesinger, 1988)
 No Frills .... Suzy (TV sitcom, 1988)
 The Diary of Anne Frank .... Anne Frank (TVM 1987)
 Northanger Abbey .... Catherine Morland (TVM 1987)

References
 Theatre Record and its annual Indexes

External links
 
 Katharine Schlesinger Drama

British television actresses
Living people
1963 births
British stage actresses
British film actresses
20th-century British actresses
Audiobook narrators
English Jews